Aznowjan (also Romanized as Aznowjān, Aznoojan, and Aznūjān) is a village in Salehan Rural District, in the Central District of Khomeyn County, Markazi Province, Iran. At the 2006 census, its population was 865, in 293 families.

References 

Populated places in Khomeyn County